Cuba intervened into numerous conflicts during the Cold War. They sent medical and military aid into foreign countries on various occasions. The interventionist policies of Cuba during the Cold War were controversial and resulted in isolation. Cuban leader Fidel Castro held power to militarily intervene in other countries that he perceived to be ruled by a tyrant or despot. Castro justified intervention into foreign conflicts stating: "Our Revolution is not a revolution of millionaires. Instead, it is one carried out by the poor, and is one which dreams of ensuring the well-being not only of our own poor, but rather of all the poor in this world. And that is why we talk of internationalism."

With Soviet backing, Cuba extended support to indigenous groups fighting for independence in Algeria, and in the then-Portuguese colonies of Angola and Mozambique as well as to the governments of newly independent African countries like Benin, Republic of the Congo (then Congo Brazzaville), Egypt, Ghana, Guinea, Guinea-Bissau, and Mali. Following the dissolution of the Soviet Union in 1991 and facing the economic difficulties during the Special Period, Cuba's methods of military intervention were severely affected. Cuba has instead adopted other methods of intervening in foreign territories.

Cuban medical internationalism was a prominent feature of their interventions alongside military aspects. Medical internationalism consisted of four prevailing approaches: emergency response medical teams sent overseas; establishment abroad of public health systems for providing free health care for local residents; taking in foreign patients to Cuba for free treatment; and providing medical training for foreigners, to Cuba and overseas.

Background 

During the Cold War, Cuba often positioned itself internationally by providing direct military assistance to those who shared the same ideology and to resistance movements with at least 200,000 members of the Cuban Revolutionary Armed Forces (FAR) serving in foreign territories during the period. Cuba perceived its interventions to be a method of directly combating the international influence of the United States. Cuba also sought to place its troops into international conflicts in order to build combat expertise among their ranks.

Informally, Cuba's ambitions of foreign military intervention began shortly after the Cuban Revolution in 1959, though it was officially adopted and pronounced in 1966 by Fidel Castro at the Organization of Solidarity with the People of Asia, Africa and Latin America. Cuba often received military and logistical assistance from the Soviet Union and Warsaw Pact nations when participating in interventionist initiatives throughout Africa and Latin America.

History

1959 Panama invasion attempt 

One of the first foreign actions taken by Cuba only months after the Revolution included an attempted coup in Panama on 24 April 1959. The coup was repelled by members of the Panamanian National Guard.

1959 Dominican Republic invasion attempt 

The Dominican Republic was invaded on 14 June 1959. Fifty-six men (Cubans, Guatemalans, Dominican exiles, and American communists) landed a C-56 transport aircraft in Constanza. As soon as the invaders landed, they were massacred by the fifteen-man Dominican garrison. A week later, two yachts offloaded 186 invaders onto Chris-Craft launches for a landing on the north coast. Dominican Air Force pilots fired rockets from their British-made Vampire jets into the approaching launches, killing most of the invaders.

Sand War 

The first official foreign deployment of Cuba's armed forces was in Algeria during the 1963 Sand War. Hundreds of Cuban troops arrived in Algeria on 22 October 1963, upon request from Algerian president Ahmed Ben Bella. Castro was convinced that the United States sought Ben Balla's overthrow and was determined to prevent this from happening. Under the command of Efigenio Ameijeiras, Cuba deployed twenty-two T-34 tanks, eighteen 120-mm mortars, a battery of 57-mm recoilless rifles, anti-aircraft artillery with eighteen guns, and eighteen 122mm field guns with the crews to operate them. Castro sought to keep the operation covert in order to avoid international backlash, with many Cuban troops participating in the conflict wearing Algerian uniforms. However, French forces quickly discovered Cuban intervention and reported it to other governments.

Venezuela and Machurucuto raid 

Soon after taking following the Cuban Revolution, Fidel Castro sought to take advantage of relations with Venezuela and incorporate its oil wealth within Cuba and quickly began to make relations with Venezuela guerrillas. President of Venezuela Rómulo Betancourt cut ties with Cuba in 1961 as part of the Betancourt Doctrine, which saw Venezuela breaking relations with governments that came to power through non-democratic means. In July 1964, the Organization of American States sanctioned Cuba after a cache of weapons destined for the Fuerzas Armadas de Liberación Nacional was discovered on Venezuela's shores. In May 1967, the Machurucuto raid saw Cuban troops attempting to make their way into the Andes to train Venezuelan guerrillas, but they were captured by the Venezuelan Army and National Guard.

Congo Crisis 

During the Congo Crisis, Cuba intervened between 1964 and 1965 and provided hundreds of personnel to assist the Simbas with overthrowing the Congolese government.
Cuba would also make contacts and provide military support to revolutionary movements during the Portuguese Colonial War beginning in the 1960s and into the 1970s.

Guinea-Bissau War of Independence 

Following the Congo Crisis, Cuba was supporting the African Party for the Independence of Guinea and Cape Verde during the Guinea-Bissau War of Independence. Several Cubans were killed in the field by Portuguese troops.

Cuba sent doctors to work in guerilla-controlled lands. The Cubans also trained Guineans in basic nursing, and some traveled to Havana to study.

Yemenite War of 1972 

Cuban pilots flew combat as well as training missions for the People's Democratic Republic of Yemen during the Yemenite War of 1972.

Insurgency in the Dominican Republic 
Dominican soldier and politician Francisco Caamaño was sent as a military attaché to London in January 1966. He was contacted by Cuban officials and fled to Cuba to start a guerrilla group in October 1967. He had a support group led by Amaury German Aristy that was expected to create the conditions for a victorious landing of Caamaño's commands in the Dominican Republic. This group was ambushed by the Dominican Army and killed during a fight that included heavy artillery and airplanes. During late 1973, after several years staying low-profile, Caamaño led the landing of a small group of rebels at Playa Caracoles, near Azua and then into the mountains of the Cordillera Central, with the purpose of starting a peasant revolution to overthrow Dominican President Joaquín Balaguer. After a few weeks of guerrilla war against Balaguer's regular army and not having received the much hoped-for peasant support, he was wounded and captured by Dominican government forces, and then summarily executed.

Yom Kippur War 

During the Yom Kippur War in October 1973, Cuba provided 4,000 troops into Syria to provide assistance on the attack against Israel. Helicopters and tanks were also provided by the Cuban military. Fighting on the Golan Heights front continued until May 1974, by which time an Israeli counterattack had largely defeated the Cuban-Syrian tank forces. The Cubans reportedly suffered casualties of approximately 180 killed and 250 wounded. After the signing of the Disengagement Agreement between Israel and Syria in May 1974, Israel remained in possession of the Golan Heights, and all Cuban forces were withdrawn in January 1975.

Armed resistance in Chile 

Cuba was the main supporter of the communist insurgency in Chile from 1973 to 1990. Cuba provided the Marxist rebel groups MIR and FPMR with weapons and financial support, as well as shelter, training inside Cuba, and logistical support. Cuba also created an operations room to politically unite the MIR and FPMR under Cuban command.

Conflicts in Angola 

As the Angolan Civil War broke out, Cuban intervention in Angola was a large-scale intervention to support the People's Movement for the Liberation of Angola (MPLA). Cuba had provided military support to MPLA  since the early 1960s, while they combatted Portuguese forces and in 1963 provided military training to guerrillas in Algeria during the Sand War. In late-1974, Cuba sent Major Alfonso Perez Morales and Carlos Cadelo to assess the situation in Angola after receiving requests for military aid. As the South African Border War intensified and more foreign actors entered into the Angolan Civil War, Cuba grew more involved. On 3 August 1975, a second Cuban mission arrived and provided US$100,000 to the MPLA. By 15 August 1975, Castro had demanded that the USSR provide more assistance to the MPLA, though the demand was declined. Cuban troops began to depart for Angola on 21 August 1975; important personnel utilized commercial aircraft while standard troops were transported by cargo ships. On 4 November 1975, Castro launched Operation Carlota, with Cuban special forces arriving in Angola shortly after on 9 November. In the Battle of Quifangondo (10 November 1975), the MPLA, supported by Cuban troops, defeated the apartheid army. On 25 November 1975, as the South African Defence Force (SADF) tried to cross a bridge, Cubans hidden along the banks of the river attacked, destroying seven armored cars and killing upwards of 90 enemy soldiers. By the end of 1975, over 25,000 Cuban troops were deployed into Angola to assist the MPLA. In February 1976, Cuban forces launched Operation Pañuelo Blanco (White Handkerchief) against an estimated 700 FLEC insurgents. This operation succeeded in annihilating the FLEC force. The Cuban troops came to have in the first campaign of 1975–1976 some 400 tanks, and in the final campaign of 1988, near 1,000 tanks.

In 1988, Cuba returned to Angola with a vengeance. The crisis began in 1987 with an assault by Soviet-equipped government troops (the People's Armed Forces of Liberation of Angola [FAPLA]) against the pro-Western rebel movement UNITA in the country's south. Soon, the apartheid South African Defence Force invaded to support the beleaguered US-backed faction and the Angolan offensive stalled. Acting independently from Moscow, Havana reinforced its African ally with 55,000 troops, tanks, artillery and MiG-23s, prompting Pretoria to call up 140,000 reservists. In June 1988, SADF armor and artillery engaged FAPLA-Cuban mechanized forces at Techipa, killing 290 Angolans and 10 Cubans. In retaliation, Cuban warplanes hammered South African troops. However, both sides quickly pulled back to avoid an escalation of hostilities. The Battle of Cuito Cuanavale stalemated, and a peace treaty was signed in September 1988. By the time the last Cuban forces returned home in 1991, 337,033 military personnel and some 50,000 civilians had served in Angola. The Cubans had lost some 15,000 killed, wounded or missing.

Ogaden War 

During the Ogaden War (1977–1978) in which Somalia attempted to invade an Ethiopia affected by the Ethiopian Civil War, Cuba deployed 18,000 troops along with armored cars, artillery, T-62 tanks, and MiGs to assist the Provisional Military Government of Socialist Ethiopia. Cuban troops and warplanes played a major part in the expulsion of Somali regulars from the Ogaden. After the Ogaden War, Ethiopian leader Mengistu repeatedly requested aid by Cuban troops in his war against Eritrean separatists, but Castro refused to intervene, instead urging Mengistu to seek a negotiated solution giving Eritrea regional autonomy.

Nicaraguan Revolution 

During the Nicaraguan Revolution, Cuba supplied military aid and logistics to Sandinista National Liberation Front guerrillas. Cuban military and intelligence personnel subsequently became incorporated into the ranks of Nicaragua's security services. Some Cuban personnel were accused of abuses, including an incident where a Cuban adviser killed two civilians in Nueva Guinea after one spilled beer on his uniform.

United States invasion of Grenada

In 1983, the US invaded Grenada, killing 25 Cubans and expelling the remainder of the Cuban aid force from the island.

Espionage in Venezuela
Ties between Cuba and Venezuela resumed in 1974 after guerrilla activity decreased in Venezuela. When Cuba began to enter its Special Period which saw domestic economic collapse, it once again became motivated to take control of Venezuela's oil wealth. When Maduro returned to Venezuela, he was allegedly tasked with serving as a Cuban mole to infiltrate Hugo Chávez's MBR-200. Venezuelan intelligence had also later discovered that Cuban Dirección de Inteligencia agents remained in Venezuela following the second inauguration of Carlos Andrés Pérez and eventually escalated political tensions during the Caracazo riots in 1989.

In Venezuela, Cuba has continued to be encouraged with intervening in Venezuela so the country can receive necessary commodities and other supplies, such as oil. According to retired Venezuelan General Carlos Julio Peñaloza Zambrano, Cuban agents might have entered Venezuela during Carlos Andrés Pérez's inauguration ceremony, which was attended by Castro, and may have waited for unrest to occur in Venezuela so they could exacerbate political tensions after the Caracazo. Still suffering from the effects of Cuba's Special Period, Castro built a relationship with emerging political figure Hugo Chávez.

1992 Venezuelan coup d'état attempts
During Hugo Chávez's 1992 Venezuelan coup d'état attempts, Castro was allegedly involved with the conspiracy and provided logistical assistance in order to establish a Venezuelan president as an ally. In 1994, Chávez and other rebels were pardoned by President Rafael Caldera an alleged accomplice of the 1992 coup attempts. Chávez would go on to visit Cuba the same year on 14 December, during the Special Period, where he was personally received by Castro with head of state honors. During his visit, Chávez gave a speech in the University of Havana Aula Magna before Castro and the Cuban high hierarchy where, among other things, he said "We have a long-term strategic project, in which Cubans have and would have much to contribute" and "it is a project with a horizon of twenty to forty years, a sovereign economic model". Chávez was elected president of Venezuela in 1998 and a year later in 1999, he proclaimed that "Venezuela is traveling towards the same sea as the Cuban people", calling Cuba and Venezuela "one country united".

Activities in Venezuela
Following the 2002 Venezuelan coup d'état attempt, Chávez's grew even closer to the Cuban government in order to maintain power and replaced military advisors with Cuban intelligence personnel. Chávez and Castro would now maintain the relationship of Venezuelan commodities traded for Cuban intelligence and logistics so both could maintain popularity. By 2010, former Major General Antonio Rivero claimed that about 92,700 Cuban officials were operating in various offices of Venezuela's government with a 2018 claim of about 46,000 members of the Cuban Revolutionary Armed Forces within Venezuela to assist Chávez's successor, Nicolás Maduro.

See also 
 Foreign interventions by China
 Foreign interventions by the Soviet Union
 Foreign interventions by the United States
 Caribbean Legion
Cuban military internationalism

References

Sources
 

Foreign relations of Cuba
Cold War military history of Cuba
Military history of Cuba
Foreign intervention